José Antonio Reynafé (1796-1837) was an Argentine politician and military man of Irish roots, who served as acting Governor of Córdoba, Argentina. In 1837 he was executed along with his brothers for the murder of Facundo Quiroga.

He was born in Villa Tulumba, Córdoba, the son of Guillermo Queenfaith, born in Ireland, and Claudia Hidalgo Torres, belonging to an old Cordovan family.

References 

1796 births
1837 deaths
Argentine people of Irish descent
Argentine people of Spanish descent
Argentine Army officers
Burials at La Recoleta Cemetery